Dawn French's Boys Who Do Comedy is a British TV series in which comedian Dawn French interviews her favourite male comedians about how they came to be comedians. It is a follow up and counterpart to Dawn French's Girls Who Do Comedy.

The full BBC One series consists of three 30-minute programmes with 35 comedians, sewn together as if they were a single discussion.  Programme 1 is about how family and early life influenced their careers, programme 2 is about the comedians' early careers, and programme 3 is about the experience of standing on stage in front of an audience.  The decision was taken early in the production process to film with three cameras, largely in close up, and with very sparing use of archive material.  Each show features five or six archive clips of a variety of other comedians past and present.

A spin-off series of six half-hour interviews, called Dawn French's More Boys Who Do Comedy, was transmitted on BBC Four, slightly bizarrely before the main BBC One series transmitted.  The featured comedians were John Cleese, Graham Norton, Bill Bailey, Rob Brydon, Russell Brand and Ken Dodd.

Comedians
Comics interviewed by Dawn included for the main BBC One series include;

Bill Bailey
Sanjeev Bhaskar
Russell Brand
Rob Brydon
Jimmy Carr
Frank Carson
John Cleese
Steve Coogan
Jack Dee
Hugh Dennis
Ken Dodd
Omid Djalili
Ben Elton
Noel Fielding
Lenny Henry
Charlie Higson
Eddie Izzard
Jethro
Sean Lock
Matt Lucas
Jackie Mason
David Mitchell
Paul Mooney (Episode 1 only)
Graham Norton
Paul O'Grady
Simon Pegg
Vic Reeves
Paul Rodriguez (Episode 3 only)
Alexei Sayle
Jimmy Tarbuck
David Walliams
Robert Webb
Paul Whitehouse
Robin Williams
Marc Wootton

Comedians featured in clips:

Episode 1: Richard Pryor, Frankie Howerd, Harpo Marx, Dudley Moore and Peter Cook, Les Dawson and Roy Barraclough, and Ade Edmondson.
Episode 2: Lenny Bruce, Woody Allen, Steve Martin, Spike Milligan, and Dick Emery.
Episode 3: George Carlin, Lee Evans, and Wilson, Keppel and Betty

References

External links
 

2007 British television series debuts
2007 British television series endings
BBC television comedy
BBC television talk shows